John "Hook" Dillon (January 8, 1924 – January 18, 2004) was an American basketball player.

He played collegiately for the University of North Carolina from 1945 to 1948. Prior to attending UNC, he previously played in the Savannah (GA) Ice Delivery city league and Benedictine Military Academy.

Dillon earned All-America honors in 1946 and 1947. He was the leading scorer on the 1946 team, which was UNC's first team to ever reach the Final Four. He first started gaining national attention early in 1946 against New York University in Madison Square Garden when he scored 21 points, many on his deadly hook shot. After the game, the media declared his shot to be one of the best ever showcased in Madison Square Garden, and the nickname stuck.

Because of his national accolades, Dillon's number 13 was honored by the University of North Carolina and currently hangs in the rafters of the Dean Smith Center.

Dillon had a brief professional career with the Toronto Huskies and  Washington Capitols of the NBA.

He died on January 18, 2004.

NBA career statistics

Regular season

Playoffs

References

External links
NBA career statistics

1924 births
2004 deaths
All-American college men's basketball players
Basketball players from Savannah, Georgia
Chicago Stags draft picks
Forwards (basketball)
North Carolina Tar Heels men's basketball players
Washington Capitols players
American men's basketball players